Barracco may refer to:
 Museo Barracco di Scultura Antica, a museum in Rome, Italy
 Alfonso Barracco, an Italian politician